IV liga Lublin group (grupa lubelska) is one of the groups of IV liga, the 5th level of Polish football league system.
The league was created in season 2000/2001 after introducing new administrative division of Poland. Until the end of the 2007/08 season IV liga lay at 4th tier of league system but this was changed with the formation of the Ekstraklasa as the top level league in Poland.
The clubs from Lublin Voivodeship compete in this group. The winner of the league is promoted to III liga group IV. The bottom teams are relegated to the groups of Liga okręgowa from Lublin Voivodeship. These groups are Biała Podlaska, Chełm, Lublin and Zamość.

Season 2000/01

Season 2001/02

Season 2002/03

Season 2003/04

Season 2004/05

Season 2005/06

Season 2006/07

Season 2007/08

Season 2008/09 
IV liga became the 5th level of Polish football league system due to the formation of Ekstraklasa as the top level league in Poland.

Season 2009/10

Season 2010/11

Season 2011/12

Season 2012/13

Season 2013/14

Season 2014/15

Season 2015/16

Season 2016/17

Season 2017/18

Season 2018/19

All-time table 
The table that follows is accurate as of the end of the 2017/18 season. It includes the clubs that played at least one match (even annulled) in IV liga Lublin group.

See also
 Lublin District League

References

Football leagues in Poland
Lublin Voivodeship